Noailhac may refer to the following places in France:

Noailhac, Aveyron, a commune in the department of Aveyron
Noailhac, Corrèze, a commune in the department of Corrèze
Noailhac, Tarn, a commune in the department of Tarn